The Hyundai Sirius engine was the company's first larger inline-four engine, with displacements from 1.8 L (1795 cc) to 2.4 L (2351 cc). It is a license-built Mitsubishi construction. This engine is no longer used by Hyundai.

1.5L (G4DJ)

		
Applications
 Hyundai Elantra (J1) (1990–1995)
 Hyundai Scoupe (1990–1992)
 Hyundai Excel/Pony (X2) (1989–1993)

1.5L (G4CL)
		
Applications
 Hyundai Elantra (J1) (1993–1995)

1.6L (G4CR)

The  Hyundai G4CR is an in-line four, dual overhead  camshaft (DOHC) engine manufactured from 1990 to 1995 under license, as it was in fact a copy of the Mitsubishi 4G61 engine, and it was put on the first generation of the Elantra model.

Details
Total displacement: 1595 cc (97.30 cu in)
Bore: 82.30 mm (3.240 in)
Stroke: 75.00 mm (2.953 in)
Compression Ratio: 9.2:1
Idle RPM: 750 ± 100
Ignition timing at idling speed: 5° ± 2°/750 rpm

Applications
 Hyundai Elantra (J1) (1990–1993)

1.8L (G4CM/G4CN/G4JN)

This engine shares its 88 mm stroke with the Mitsubishi 4G67 from which it is derived, but thanks to a 80.6 mm bore the displacement is kept beneath the 1800 cc threshold, allowing for lower road taxes in some markets.

Applications (G4CM)
 Hyundai Elantra (1990–1993)
 Hyundai Sonata (1988–1998)

G4CN is the  DOHC engine based on the Mitsubishi 4G67.

Applications (G4CN)
 Hyundai Elantra (1993–1999)
 Hyundai Sonata (1993–1998)

G4JN (Sirius II) is a  Korean version DOHC engine with an 81.5 mm bore and 88 mm stroke.

Applications (G4JN)
 Hyundai Sonata (EF) (1998–2001)
 Kia Optima (MS) (2000–2005)

2.0L (G4CP/G4JP/L4CP/L4JP)

G4CP is Hyundai's name for the  Mitsubishi 4G63 engine.

Applications (G4CP)
 Hyundai Grandeur (L) (1986–1992) 
 Hyundai Sonata (1988–1998)

G4JP 2.0 (Sirius II) is the  Korean version. Bore x stroke is 85 mm × 88 mm (3.35 in × 3.46 in). It has a cast iron engine block and aluminum DOHC cylinder heads. It uses MFI fuel injection, has 4 valves per cylinder and features forged steel connecting rods.

Applications (G4JP)
 Hyundai Grandeur (LX) (1992–1998) 
 Hyundai Santa Fe (SM) (2000–2005)
 Hyundai Sonata (1993–2004)
 Hyundai Trajet (1999–2007)
 Kia Optima (MS) (2000–2005)
 Kia Joice (1999–2002)

4GA1-1  JAC's 4GA1-1 was learnt from Hyundai, it uses DOHC 16-valves and SFI technology

Applications (4GA1-1)
JAC S1(Ruiying)

		
Applications (L4CP)
 Hyundai Santamo (1997–2002)

		
Applications (L4JP)
 Kia Joice (1999–2002)

2.4L (G4CS/G4JS/L4CS)
There are two variants of the  Sirius engine called G4CS and G4JS, bore is 86.5 mm while stroke is 100 mm. 

Applications (G4CS)
Hyundai Grandeur (1986–1998)
Hyundai Sonata (1988–1991)
Hyundai Starex (1997–2004)

The G4JS has a compression ratio of 10.0:1. It has a cast iron engine block and aluminum DOHC cylinder heads. It uses MPI fuel injection and features forged steel connecting rods.

Applications (G4JS)
Hyundai Santa Fe
Hyundai Sonata
Hyundai Starex
Kia Optima (2000–2005)
Kia Sorento

Applications (L4CS)
Hyundai Starex (1997–2004)

See also
 List of Hyundai engines

References

Sirius

Straight-four engines